Ali Nasser Ali Hasan (born 23 November 1996) is an Yemeni professional footballer who plays for East Riffa.

References

External links 
 
 

1996 births
Living people
Yemeni footballers
Association football midfielders
Yemeni expatriate footballers
Expatriate footballers in Spain
Expatriate footballers in Bahrain
Expatriate footballers in Belarus
East Riffa Club players
FC Slavia Mozyr players